William Michael Jeffrey Akabi-Davis (born 3 August 1962) is a Sierra Leonean sprinter. He competed in the men's 400 metres at the 1980 Summer Olympics.

References

External links
 

1962 births
Living people
Athletes (track and field) at the 1980 Summer Olympics
Sierra Leonean male sprinters
Olympic athletes of Sierra Leone
Sierra Leone Creole people